Orendel is a Middle High German epic poem. Composed of around 4,000 lines, it is traditionally dated to the end of the 12th century. The earliest known manuscript (1477) was lost in a fire in 1870.

Synopsis
The story is associated with the town of Treves (Trier), where the poem was probably written. The introduction narrates the story of the Holy Coat, which, after many adventures, is swallowed by a whale. It is recovered by Orendel, son of King Eigel of Treves, who had embarked with twenty-two ships in order to woo Bride, the mistress of the Holy Sepulchre, as his wife. Suffering shipwreck, he falls into the hands of the fisherman Ise, and in his service catches the whale that has swallowed the Holy Coat. The coat has the property of rendering the wearer proof against wounds, and Orendel successfully overcomes innumerable perils and eventually wins Bride for his wife.

A message brought by an angel summons both back to Treves, where Orendel meets with many adventures and at last disposes of the Holy Coat by placing it in a stone sarcophagus. Another angel announces both his and Brida's approaching death, when they renounce the world and prepare for the end.

Analysis 
The author was likely a cleric, possibly living in or near the city of Trier. The story of the return of the Holy Coat to Trier is probably based on the fact that, in 1196, the Holy Coat was solemnly transferred to the new altar of Trier Cathedral.

According to scholars Marion Gibbs and Sidney M. Johnson:

Publication and extant translations
The single manuscript of the poem, redacted in 1477 in Strasbourg, was lost in a fire in 1870. There remain two prints (one verse, one prose) from 1512 in Augsburg, which used different sources, and a handwritten copy from Berlin made in 1818. The 16th-century prints were possibly made to coincide with the rediscovery of the seamless robe of Christ in Trier cathedral by Emperor Maximilian I.

The poem has been edited by von der Hagen (1844), L. Ettmüller (1858) and A. E. Berger (1888); there is a modern German translation by K. Simrock (1845). See H. Harkensee, Untersuchungen über das Spielmannsgedicht Orendel (1879); F. Vogt, in the Zeitschrift für deutsche Philologie, vol. xxii. (1890); R. Heinzel, Über das Gedicht vom König Orendel (1892); and K. Müllenhoff, in Deutsche Altertumskunde, vol. i. (2nd ed., 1890), pp. 32 seq.

The name of the hero appears under several variants in the editions: Orendel (1477 MS, 1512 print), Aren(n)del (1512 prose print), Erendelle (Anh des Hb., MS burnt 1870), and Ernthelle (Anh d. Hb. c.1483 print).

References

Bibliography

Further reading
 

Medieval German poems